John Allison (born 1976) is a comic writer and artist. He has been producing comics since 1998 and his work has won multiple Eisner Awards.

Biography 
Allison started creating webcomics in 1998 with Bobbins, a series which ran on Keenspot. He ended Bobbins in 2002, later saying that he had fallen out of love with the rough and ready nature of 'Bobbins', and at the same time started a new comic, Scary Go Round. Then, in 2009, he ended Scary Go Round and started Bad Machinery. In an interview, Allison said that he ended Scary Go Round because "the work I was doing was becoming somewhat uninspired. I had a lot of characters that I didn't care about, and I was making whole runs of strips about characters that people didn't really like... I had lost perspective and direction. I was also losing readers for the last year and it was evident that changes had to be made." 

Allison described Scary Go Round as "a comic that I've been making since 2002. It started off as a comic about barmaids Tessa and Rachel, then it became more about Shelley Winters and her bizarre escapades. In recent times it is kind of a split between the Shelley Show and Tackleford Grammar School. It's always evolving." Bad Machinery focuses on several of those grammar school children, now teenage detectives.

In 2013, Allison pitched a spin-off from Scary Go Round, Giant Days, to Boom! Box, a newly formed imprint of Boom! Studios for established artists outside the comics industry. The series follows three young women—Esther de Groot, Susan Ptolemy and Daisy Wooton—who share a hall of residence at the University of Sheffield. The series began as a six-issue limited run, and was then picked up as an ongoing series. In 2016, Giant Days was nominated for two Eisner Awards and three Harvey Awards, with a fourth Harvey nomination for Lissa Treiman's work on the comic. In 2019, it won two Eisner Awards, for Best Continuing Series and Best Humor Publication. It concluded later that year with a special over-sized issue.

The success of Giant Days led to further work with independent presses. Allison went on to write the series By Night for Boom! Studios, and is now writing and drawing Steeple for Dark Horse Comics.

Allison currently resides in Letchworth Garden City.

Works
 Bobbins (1998–2002, 2014–present)
 Scary Go Round (2002–2009)
Bad Machinery (2009–present)
 Giant Days (2011, 2015–2019)
 By Night (2018–19)
 Steeple (2019–present)
 Wicked Things (2020–present)

Awards 

|-
| 2002
| Bobbins
| UK National Comics Awards: Best Online Strip
| 
| 
|-
| 2002
| Bobbins
| Web Cartoonist's Choice Awards in three categories: * Best Use of Color  * Best Site Design  * Best Female Character
| 
| 
|-
| 2003
| Scary Go Round
| Web Cartoonist's Choice Awards: Outstanding Original Digital Art
| 
| 
|-
| 2003
| Scary Go Round
| Web Cartoonist's Choice Awards in three other categories: * Outstanding Art  * Outstanding Environment Design  * Outstanding Use of Color
| 
| 
|-
| 2004
| Scary Go Round
| Web Cartoonist's Choice Awards: Outstanding Art
| 
| Joint winner with Mac Hall
|-
| 2004
| Scary Go Round
| Web Cartoonist's Choice Awards in six other categories: * Outstanding Comic  * Outstanding Writing  * Outstanding Environment Design  * Outstanding Character (Writing)  * Outstanding Comedic Comic  * Outstanding Story Concept
| 
| 
|-
| 2005
| Scary Go Round
| Web Cartoonist's Choice Awards: Outstanding Comic
| 
| 
|-
| 2005
| Scary Go Round
| Web Cartoonist's Choice Awards in three other categories:  * Outstanding Art  * Outstanding Environment Design  * Outstanding Layout
| 
| 
|-
| 2006
| Scary Go Round
| Web Cartoonist's Choice Awards: Outstanding Comic
| 
| 
|-
| 2007
| Scary Go Round
| Web Cartoonist's Choice Awards in three categories:  * Outstanding Comic  * Outstanding Character Writing  * Outstanding Writer
| 
| 
|-
| 2008
| Scary Go Round
| Web Cartoonist's Choice Awards: Outstanding Character Rendering
| 
| 
|-
| 2016
| Giant Days
| Eisner Award: Best Continuing Series
| 
| Allison wrote for Giant Days. The nomination was for John Allison, Max Sarin, and Julaa Madrigal.
|-
| 2016
| Giant Days
| Eisner Award: Best Writer
| 
| 
|-
| 2017
| Bad Machinery, Vol. 5: The Case of the Fire Inside
| Eisner Award: Best Publication for teens (ages 13-17)
| 
| 
|-
| 2018
| Giant Days
| Eisner Award: Best Continuing Series
| 
| Allison wrote for Giant Days. The nomination was for John Allison, Max Sarin, and Julaa Madrigal.
|-
| 2018
| Giant Days
| Eisner Award: Best Humor Publication
| 
| Allison wrote for Giant Days. The nomination was for John Allison, Max Sarin, and Julaa Madrigal.
|-
| 2019
| Giant Days
| Eisner Award: Best Continuing Series
| 
| Allison wrote for Giant Days. The nomination was for John Allison, Max Sarin, and Julaa Madrigal.
|-
| 2019
| Giant Days
| Eisner Award: Best Humor Publication
| 
| Allison wrote for Giant Days. The nomination was for John Allison, Max Sarin, and Julaa Madrigal.

References

External links
official website
official website

1976 births
Living people
British webcomic creators
British comics artists
Web Cartoonists' Choice Award winners